Jonathan B. Losos (born December 7, 1961, in St. Louis County, Missouri) is an American evolutionary biologist and Herpetologist.

Life
Losos studied biology at Harvard University, from which he received a Bachelor's degree in 1984. Later on, in 1989, he received a PhD in Zoology from the University of California, Berkeley (Ecomorphological Adaptation in the Genus Anolis). Starting in 1987, he worked as a Teaching assistant in Berkeley. After receiving his PhD, he moved to  the University of California, Davis in 1990 to become one of the inaugural postdoctoral fellows at the Center for Population Biology. Losos then, from 1992 on, was Assistant professor at the Washington University in St. Louis, and then was promoted to the rank of Associate professor in 1997 and Professor in 2001.

His work focuses on a wide range of topics, but he is best known for his studies of convergent evolution and adaptive radiation, and for experimental studies of evolution in nature. Most of his empirical work has involved the evolutionary radiation of lizards in the genus Anolis which occur in Central and South America and on islands in the Caribbean.

From 2000 to 2003 and 2004–2005, Losos was director of Tyson Research Center at Washington University in St. Louis. In 2006, Losos left Washington University to become the Monique and Philip Lehner Professor for the Study of Latin America at Harvard University and Professor in the Department of Organismic and Evolutionary Biology, as well as Curator in Herpetology of the Museum of Comparative Zoology. Losos then returned to Washington University in 2018 to become the William H. Danforth Distinguished University Professor in the Department of Biology, as well as the founding director of the Living Earth Collaborative, a biodiversity partnership between Washington University, the Missouri Botanical Garden and the Saint Louis Zoo.

Honors and awards
Losos has received a number of awards, including the Dobzhansky Prize in 1991, the David Starr Jordan Prize in 1998, the Edward O. Wilson Naturalist Award in 2009, the Daniel Giraud Elliot Medal in 2012 and the Sewall Wright Award in 2019.

Losos is a Fellow of the American Association for the Advancement of Science (2005), as well as the American Academy of Arts and Sciences (2012) and the National Academy of Sciences (2018). In 2016, he received the Distinguished Herpetologist award of The Herpetologists' League.

Works

As author

As editor

References

Living people
Harvard University faculty
21st-century American biologists
University of California, Berkeley alumni
Members of the United States National Academy of Sciences
1961 births
Scientists from St. Louis
Washington University in St. Louis faculty
Harvard College alumni